The following is a list of notable companies based in Zamboanga City. Zamboanga is a highly urbanized city located in Mindanao, Philippines. With a population of more than 807,129, according to the 2010 census, it is the sixth most populous and third largest city by land area in the Philippines.

Companies
Zamboanga